Reginald Thomas Herbert Fletcher, 1st Baron Winster,  (27 March 1885 – 7 June 1961) was a British Liberal then Labour politician. He was Minister of Civil Aviation under Clement Attlee between 1945 and 1946 and Governor of Cyprus between 1946 and 1949.

Political career
Following service during the First World War as a Royal Navy officer Fletcher was elected as Liberal Member of Parliament (MP) for Basingstoke in 1923 by 348 votes but lost the seat in 1924. In 1935 he was elected as Labour MP for Nuneaton. He was raised to the peerage as Baron Winster, of Witherslack in the County of Westmorland, in 1942 and made a Privy Counsellor in 1945. From 1945 to 1946 he was Minister of Civil Aviation in the government of Clement Attlee. The latter year he was appointed Governor of Cyprus, a position he held until 1949.

Personal life
Lord Winster died in 1961 at the age of 76 in the Uckfield Rural District, Sussex. The peerage became extinct on his death.

References

External links 
 
 

1885 births
1961 deaths
Fletcher, Reginald
Fletcher, Reginald
Members of the Privy Council of the United Kingdom
Fletcher, Reginald
Fletcher, Reginald
UK MPs who were granted peerages
Governors of British Cyprus
Knights Commander of the Order of St Michael and St George
Royal Navy officers
Royal Navy officers of World War I
Labour Party (UK) hereditary peers
Ministers in the Attlee governments, 1945–1951
Barons created by George VI